Tigrana is a genus of moths of the family Erebidae. The genus was erected by Francis Walker in 1866.

Species
 Tigrana detritalis Walker, [1866]
 Tigrana fervidalis Walker, [1866]

References

Hypeninae
Moth genera